This is a list of ancient monuments from Republican and Imperial periods in the city of Rome, Italy.

Amphitheaters

 Amphitheater of Caligula
 Amphitheatrum Castrense
 Amphitheater of Nero
 Amphitheater of Statilius Taurus
 Colosseum

Baths

 Baths of Agrippa
 Baths of Caracalla
 Baths of Commodus
 Baths of Constantine
 Baths of Decius
 Baths of Diocletian
 Baths of Licinius Sura
 Baths of Nero and Alexander
 Baths of Septimius Severus
 Baths of Titus
 Baths of Trajan (later misnamed the Baths of Domitian)

Circuses

 Circus Flaminius
 Circus Maximus
 Circus of Maxentius
 Circus of Nero
 Circus Varianus

Gardens

 Gardens of Lucullus
 Gardens of Maecenas
 Gardens of Sallust
 Horti Aciliorum
 Horti Agrippinae
 Horti Caesaris
 Horti Domitiae
 Horti Lamiani
 Horti Liciniani
 Horti Lolliani
 Horti Pompeiani
 Horti Tauriani

Porticoes

 Porticus Aemilia
 Porticus Deorum Consentium
 Porticus of Livia
 Porticus Octavia
 Porticus Octaviae
 Porticus Vipsania

Theatres

 Theatre of Balbus
 Theatre of Marcellus
 Theatre of Pompey

Other

 Ludus Magnus
 Naumachia Vaticana
 Odeum of Domitian
 Saepta Julia
 Septizodium
 Stadium of Domitian

Economy

Fora

Forum Romanum

 Roman Forum

Imperial fora
 Forum of Augustus
 Forum of Caesar
 Forum of Nerva
 Forum of Peace
 Trajan's Forum

Markets
 Forum Boarium
 Forum Holitorium
 Forum Piscarium
 Forum Pistorium
 Forum Suarium
 Forum venalium
 Forum Vinarium
 Trajan's Market

Shops
 Macellum Liviae

Infrastructure

Aqueducts

 Aqua Alexandrina
 Aqua Alsietina 
 Aqua Anio Novus 	
 Aqua Anio Vetus
 Aqua Appia	
 Aqua Augusta
 Aqua Claudia 	
 Aqua Julia
 Aqua Marcia 	
 Aqua Tepula 	
 Aqua Traiana 	 	
 Aqua Virgo

Bridges

 Pons Aelius
 Pons Aemilius
 Pons Agrippae
 Pons Aurelius
 Pons Cestius
 Pons Fabricius
 Pons Lamentanus
 Pons Milvius
 Pons Neronianus
 Pons Probi
 Pons Sublicius

Cemeteries

 Catacomb of Calepodius
 Catacomb of Callixtus
 Catacombs of Marcellinus and Peter
 Catacombs of Rome
 Catacombs of San Valentino
 Columbarium of Pomponius Hylas
 Esquiline Necropolis
 Vatican Necropolis

Fountains

 Meta Sudans

Military

 Castra of ancient Rome
 Castra Nova equitum singularium
 Castra Peregrina
 Castra Praetoria

Roads

 Alta Semita
 Argiletum
 Clivus Argentarius
 Clivus Capitolinus
 Clivus Palatinus
 Clivus Scauri
 Clivus Suburanus
 Via Appia
 Via Ardeatina
 Via Asinaria
 Via Aurelia
 Via Cornelia
 Via Flaminia
 Via Labicana
 Via Lata
 Via Latina
 Via Laurentina
 Via Ostiensis
 Via Portuensis
 Via Praenestina
 Via Sacra
 Via Salaria
 Via Tiburtina
 Vicus Jugarius
 Vicus Longus
 Vicus Patricius
 Vicus Tuscus

Sewers
 Cloaca Circi Maximi
 Cloaca Maxima

Walls / Gates

 Wall of Romulus
 Servian Wall
 Porta Caelimontana
 Porta Capena
 Porta Carmentalis
 Porta Collina
 Porta Esquilina
 Porta Flumentana
 Porta Fontinalis
 Porta Lavernalis
 Porta Naevia
 Porta Querquetulana
 Porta Quirinalis
 Porta Raudusculana
 Porta Salutaris
 Porta Sanqualis
 Porta Trigemina
 Porta Viminale
 Aurelian Walls
 Porta Appia
 Porta Ardeatina
 Porta Asinaria
 Porta Aurelia Pancraziana
 Porta Aurelia-Sancti Petri
 Porta Clausa
 Porta Flaminia
 Porta Latina
 Porta Praenestina
 Porta Metronia
 Porta Nomentana
 Porta Ostiensis
 Porta Pinciana
 Porta Portese
 Porta Praetoriana
 Porta Principalis Dextera
 Porta Salaria
 Porta Septimiana
 Porta Tiburtina

Monuments

Triumphal arches

 Arcus Argentariorum
 Arcus Novus
 Arch of Arcadius, Honorius and Theodosius
 Arch of Augustus
 Arch of Claudius (British victory)
 Arches of Claudius
 Arch of Constantine
 Arch of Dolabella
 Arch of Domitian
 Arches of Drusus and Germanicus
 Arch of Fabius
 Arch of Gallienus
 Arch of Germanicus
 Arch of Gratian, Valentinian and Theodosius
 Arch of Hadrian (now referred to as the Arch of Portugal)
 Arch of Janus
 Arch of Lentulus and Crispinus
 Arch of Marcus Aurelius
 Arch of Nero
 Arch of Octavius
 Arch of Pietas
 Arch of Scipio
 Arch of Septimius Severus
 Arch of Tiberius
 Arch of Titus (Circus Maximus)
 Arch of Titus (Roman Forum)
 Arch of Trajan (now referred to as the Arch of Drusus)

Columns

 Column of Antoninus Pius
 Column of Marcus Aurelius
 Column of Phocas
 Decennalia
 Trajan's Column

Statues
 Colossus of Constantine
 Colossus of Nero
 Equestrian Statue of Marcus Aurelius

Tombs

 Casal Rotondo
 Meta Romuli
 Pyramid of Cestius
 Terebinth of Nero
 Tomb of Caecilia Metella
 Tomb of Eurysaces the Baker
 Tomb of Geta
 Tomb of the Scipios

Mausoleums

 Mausoleum of Augustus
 Mausoleum of Hadrian
 Mausoleum of Helena
 Mausoleum of Honorius
 Mausoleum of Maxentius

Obelisks

 Flaminio Obelisk
 Lateran Obelisk
 Obelisco della Minerva
 Obelisk of Montecitorio

Palaces

 Domus Aurea
 Domus Severiana
 Domus Tiberiana
 Domus Transitoria
 House of Augustus
 Palace of Domitian
Domus Augustana
Domus Flavia

Religion

Altars

 Altar of Augustan Peace
 Altar of Consus
 Altar of Dis Pater and Proserpine
 Altar of Domitius Ahenobarbus
 Altar of Victory
 Great Altar of Hercules

Basilicas

 Basilica Aemilia
 Basilica Argentaria
 Basilica Fulvia
 Basilica Hilariana
 Basilica Julia
 Basilica of Junius Bassus
 Basilica of Maxentius
 Basilica of Neptune
 Basilica Opimia
 Basilica Porcia
 Basilica Sempronia
 Basilica Ulpia
 Porta Maggiore Basilica

Early churches

 Basilica di San Clemente
 Basilica di Santa Maria Maggiore
 Basilica of Saint Paul Outside the Walls
 Basilica of St. John Lateran
 Lateran Baptistery
 Old St. Peter's Basilica
 San Sebastiano fuori le mura
 San Pietro in Vincoli
 Santa Costanza
 Santa Pudenziana
 Santa Sabina

Temples

Aventine Hill
 Temple of Bona Dea
 Temple of Ceres
 Temple of Diana Aventina
 Temple of Juno Regina
 Temple of Luna
 Temple of Minerva

Caelian Hill
 Temple of Claudius

Capitoline Hill
 Temple of Fides
 Temple of Fortuna Redux
 Temple of Juno Moneta
 Temple of Jupiter Custos
 Temple of Jupiter Feretrius
 Temple of Jupiter Optimus Maximus
 Temple of Jupiter Tonans
 Temple of Ops
 Temple of Veiovis

Campus Martius

 Pantheon
 Temple of Apollo Sosianus
 Temple of Bellona
 Temple of Feronia
 Temple of Fortuna Equestris
 Temple of Hadrian
 Temple of Hercules Custos
 Temple of Hercules Musarum
 Temple of Isis and Serapis
 Temple of Juno Regina
 Temple of Jupiter Stator
 Temple of Juturna
 Temple of the Lares
 Temple of Matidia
 Temple of the Sun
 Temple of Mars
 Temple of Minerva Chalcidica
 Temple of Neptunus
 Temple of Fortuna Huiusce Diei
 Temple of the Nymphs
 Temple of Vulcanus

Esquiline Hill
 Temple of Juno Lucina
 Temple of Minerva Medica (no longer extant)
 Nymphaeum called the 'Temple of Minerva Medica'

Forum Boarium

 Temple of Hercules Pompeianus
 Temple of Hercules Victor
 Temple of Fortuna
 Temple of Mater Matuta
 Temple of Portunus
 Temple of Pudicitia Patricia

Forum Holitorium
 Temple of Janus
 Temple of Juno Sospita
 Temple of Piety
 Temple of Spes
 Temple of Victory (Himera)

Forum Romanum

Temple of Antoninus and Faustina 
Temple of Caesar 
Temple of Castor and Pollux
Temple of Concord 
Temple of Janus
Temple of Romulus
Temple of Saturn 
Temple of Venus and Roma 
Temple of Vespasian and Titus 
Temple of Vesta

Imperial fora

 Temple of Mars Ultor
 Temple of Minerva
 Temple of Trajan
 Temple of Peace
 Temple of Venus Genetrix

Palatine Hill
 Elagabalium
 Temple of Apollo Palatinus
 Temple of Cybele
 Temple of Juno Sospita
 Temple of Victory
 Temple of Fortuna Respiciens

Quirinal Hill
 Temple of the Flavia gens
 Temple of Pudicitia Plebeia
 Temple of Quirinus
 Temple of Serapis

Tiber Island
 Temple of Asclepius
 Temple of Faunus

External links
ROME at LacusCurtius

Monuments
Monuments
Ancient monuments